Malina Cove is the 1.65 km wide cove indenting for 1.25 km the west coast of Low Island in the South Shetland Islands, Antarctica.  It is entered south of Jameson Point and north of Ugorelets Point.

The cove is named after the settlements of Gorna (Upper) Malina and Dolna (Lower) Malina in western Bulgaria.

Location
British mapping in 2009.

Maps
 South Shetland Islands: Smith and Low Islands. Scale 1:150000 topographic map No. 13677. British Antarctic Survey, 2009.
 Antarctic Digital Database (ADD). Scale 1:250000 topographic map of Antarctica. Scientific Committee on Antarctic Research (SCAR), 1993–2016.

References
 Bulgarian Antarctic Gazetteer. Antarctic Place-names Commission. (details in Bulgarian, basic data in English)
 Malina Cove. SCAR Composite Antarctic Gazetteer]

External links
 Malina Cove. Copernix satellite image

Coves of the South Shetland Islands
Bulgaria and the Antarctic